Aghaboe is a townland in Aghaboe civil parish in County Laois.

References

Townlands of County Laois